Ana Arabia ("I Am Arab") is a 2013 French-Israeli drama film written and directed by Amos Gitai. It was entered into the main competition at the 70th Venice International Film Festival.
 It consists of a single long take.

Cast

 Yuval Scharf: Yael
 Yussuf Abu-Warda: Yussuf
 Sarah Adler: Miriam
 Asi Levi: Sarah
 Uri Gavriel: Hassan
 Norman Issa: Norman

References

External links

2013 drama films
2013 films
Films directed by Amos Gitai
French drama films
Israeli drama films
One-shot films
2010s French films